NA-250 Karachi Central-IV is a constituency for the National Assembly of Pakistan that covers North Nazimabad.

Members of Parliament

2018-2023: NA-256 Karachi Central-IV

Election 2002 

General elections were held on 10 Oct 2002. Kanwar Khalid Younus of Muttahida Qaumi Movement won by 51,696 votes.

Election 2008 

General elections were held on 18 Feb 2008. Farhat Mohammad Khan of Muttahida Qaumi Movement won by 149,157 votes.

Election 2013 

General elections were held on 11 May 2013. Muhammad Rehan Hashmi of Muttahida Qaumi Movement won by 115,776 votes and became the member of National Assembly.

Election 2018 

General elections were held on 25 July 2018.

By-election 2023 
A by-election will be held on 16 March 2023 due to the resignation of Najeeb Haroon, the previous MNA from this seat.

See also
NA-249 Karachi Central-III
NA-251 Killa Saifullah-cum-Zhob-cum-Sherani

References

External links 
Election result's official website

NA-245
Karachi